CarGurus is a Cambridge, Massachusetts-based automotive research and shopping website that assists users in comparing local listings for used and new cars, and contacting sellers.

History 

CarGurus was founded in 2006 by Langley Steinert, a co-founder of TripAdvisor. Langley Steinert was the company's CEO until January, 2021 when CFO Jason Trevisan was named as the company's CEO. The company started off as an automotive community blog where consumers could post reviews and questions about local dealers, shops, and types of cars. Dealers expressed interest in advertising on the site, and the company changed its business strategy to connect dealers and consumers by putting inventory on the site. 

From 2009 to 2011, the company's visitor traffic increased from 9 million per month to 21 million per month.

Business 

CarGurus is an automotive research and shopping website that assists users in comparing local listings for used and new cars and contacting sellers. CarGurus uses algorithms to analyze and compare prices and features on cars for sale. Users can search for specific cars in their local area and compare listings by price, features, and dealership reputation. The company also offers a discussion platform for car enthusiasts and automotive experts, who submit questions, offer insight, gather and share information, and provide reviews. The company operates websites in the United States, Canada, the United Kingdom, Italy, Spain, and Germany.

CarGurus was privately owned until its $150 million IPO on 12 October 2017; its board of directors includes Steve Kaufer, co-founder and CEO of TripAdvisor; Greg Schwartz, President Media and Marketplace of Zillow; and Steve Conine, Co-founder of Wayfair.

In 2018, CarGurus purchased the UK website and forum PistonHeads for an undisclosed amount.   In 2020, CarGurus purchased US auto listings site Autolist  and purchased a 51% stake in wholesale vehicle platform CarOffer.  

The company was involved in a trademark dispute with the Rich Rebuilds channel, who changed their name after legal action was threatened.

Recognition

CarGurus ranked on the Inc. 500 Fastest Growing Private Companies in 2011, 2012, and 2013, and the Inc. 5000 in 2014, 2015, and 2016.  The company was also named to Forbes' Most Promising Companies list in 2015.

Partnerships

As of 2014, CarGurus provides all used and new cars searches for Boston.com.

References

2006 establishments in Massachusetts
Online automotive companies of the United States
Online marketplaces of the United States
Auto dealerships of the United States
Companies listed on the Nasdaq
American companies established in 2006
Retail companies established in 2006
Internet properties established in 2006
2017 initial public offerings
Used car market
Companies based in Cambridge, Massachusetts